Geraku (also Romanized as Gerākū; also known as Gīzā Kūh and Karāgū) is a village in Gasht Rural District, in the Central District of Fuman County, Gilan Province, Iran. At the 2006 census, its population was 306, in 75 families.

References 

Populated places in Fuman County